Neptis metella, the yellow-base sailer, is a butterfly in the family Nymphalidae. It is found in Guinea, Sierra Leone, Liberia, Ivory Coast, Ghana, Togo, Benin, from Nigeria to the Democratic Republic of the Congo and in Uganda, Sudan, Kenya and Tanzania. The habitat consists of forests.

The larvae feed on Acalypha neptunica pubescens.

Subspecies
Neptis metella metella (Guinea, Sierra Leone, Liberia, Ivory Coast, Ghana, Togo, Benin, Nigeria to Democratic Republic of the Congo, western Uganda, southern Sudan, north-western Tanzania) 
Neptis metella flavimacula Jackson, 1951 (Uganda: east to the western slopes of Mount Elgon, western Kenya)

References

Butterflies described in 1848
metella